Lisa Schmitz (born 4 May 1992) is a German footballer who plays as a goalkeeper for Montpellier in the Division 1 Feminine. She has also played for Germany.

Club career

Schmitz started playing football at Germania Zündorf and joined second division team Bayer 04 Leverkusen in 2008. Being Bayer's first choice goalkeeper she helped her team getting promoted to the Bundesliga in 2010. She was named best goalkeeper at the DFB-Hallenpokal in 2014 and 2015 and won that cup in 2015. After having played 121 league games for Leverkusen, thereof 86 in the Bundesliga, Schmitz signed a two-year contract with Turbine Potsdam in 2015.

International career
Schmitz made her debut for Germany under-15 national team in 2007. In 2008, she was part of the U17 team that won the UEFA U17 Championship and finished third at the FIFA U17 World Cup later that year. Being third choice goalkeeper behind Anna Felicitas Sarholz and Almuth Schult she did not appear in any of the tournament matches. In 2011, she was called up to the Germany team that won the UEFA U19 Championship and played in 4 matches at the tournament final.

Honours

Bayer 04 Leverkusen
2. Bundesliga South: 2009–10
DFB-Hallenpokal: 2015

Germany
UEFA U-17 Championship: Winner 2008
FIFA U-17 Women's World Cup: Third place 2008
UEFA U-19 Championship: Winner 2011

References

External links

1992 births
Living people
German women's footballers
German expatriate women's footballers
Germany women's international footballers
1. FFC Turbine Potsdam players
Bayer 04 Leverkusen (women) players
Footballers from Cologne
Women's association football goalkeepers
Frauen-Bundesliga players
Montpellier HSC (women) players
Division 1 Féminine players
Expatriate women's footballers in France
German expatriate sportspeople in France